The Cropley Baronetcy, of Clerkenwell in the County of Middlesex, was a title in the Baronetage of England. It was created on 7 May 1661 for John Cropley. The second Baronet sat as Member of Parliament for Shaftesbury. The title became extinct on his death in 1713.

Cropley baronets, of Clerkenwell (1661)
Sir John Cropley, 1st Baronet (died 1676)
Sir John Cropley, 2nd Baronet (1663–1713)

References

Extinct baronetcies in the Baronetage of England
1661 establishments in England